Arthur Bobby de Wee (born 4 February 1994) is a South African rugby union player for the Ealing Trailfinders in the RFU Championship.

Career

Youth: Leopards and Blue Bulls

De Wee also represented the Blue Bulls after finishing school, making seven appearances for the  side in the 2013 Under-19 Provincial Championship, in a season that saw them win all twelve of their matches in the regular season of the competition. De Wee didn't feature in the title play-offs as the Blue Bulls won the competition, beating the s 35–23 in the final.

Golden Lions

De Wee then made the short move to Johannesburg to join the  prior to the 2014 season. De Wee wasn't involved in the play-offs, as the Golden Lions went all the way to the final, which they lost 6–30 to Griquas.

Despite still being at Under-20 age-level, De Wee was a key player for the s in the 2014 Under-21 Provincial Championship, starting all twelve of their matches in the regular season.

De Wee returned to first class action in the 2015 Vodacom Cup, starting all but one of the Golden Lions' matches in the competition. He scored two of the Golden Lions' eight tries in a 53–3 victory over Namibian side  in Windhoek on the opening day of the competition and helped the Golden Lions to finish top of the Northern Section log, winning all seven of their matches. He once again represented the s in the 2015 Under-21 Provincial Championship Group A, scoring tries in matches against the s and s as they secured a semi-final place by finishing in fourth spot.

In October, he was included in the starting line-up for the Golden Lions in their final match of the 2015 Currie Cup Premier Division season, against  in Johannesburg, and subsequently made his Currie Cup debut, playing the first 69 minutes of a 29–19 victory to help the Golden Lions retain their unbeaten record in the competition.

Southern Kings
In 2017, he signed with Pro14 side Southern Kings.

Ealing Trailfinders
On 15 January 2021, Bobby traveled to England to join RFU Championship side Ealing Trailfinders from the 2020-21 season.

References

South African rugby union players
Living people
1994 births
People from Klerksdorp
Rugby union locks
Rugby union flankers
Golden Lions players
Southern Kings players
Ealing Trailfinders Rugby Club players
South African expatriate sportspeople in England
Rugby union players from North West (South African province)